Janeczek is a Polish surname. Notable people with this surname include:

 Bernhard Janeczek (born 1992), Austrian football player
 Helena Janeczek (born 1964), Italian novelist
 Jerzy Janeczek (1944–2021), Polish theater and film actor
 Paweł Janeczek (1973–2010), Polish politician